Fourth Avenue Line may refer to the following transit lines:
BMT Fourth Avenue Line, a rapid transit line of the BMT division of the New York City Subway, mainly running under Fourth Avenue in Brooklyn
Fourth and Madison Avenues Line, a rail line established in Manhattan in the 1830s, replaced by buses on the Fifth and Madison Avenues Line